The Asubima Forest Reserve is a  protected area near Akumadan, Ghana and was established in 1945. FORM Ghana, a plantation development company, manages  of the southern part of the reserve to reforest land in the reserve that has been highly degraded due to logging, wildfires, and illegal farming. The reserve is located at the northern edge of the semi-deciduous forest ecological zone, which is characterized by alternating wet and dry seasons in a tropical monsoon climate.

Located 9 kilometers east of Akumadan in Ghana, in the Ashanti region, the Asubima Forest Reserve is a forest area aimed at preserving Ghanaian tree species. The reserve includes programs such as high-quality nurseries, model plantations and intervention programs that work against deforestation, deforestation, wood fires and illegal agriculture. Local farmers participate in the programs, working on plantations as workers, guards or members of the fire brigade.

References

Protected areas established in 1945
Forest reserves of Ghana